Democratic Center Movement (Spanish: Movimiento Centro Democrático) is a political party in Ecuador. It is led by Jimmy Jairala and holds one seat in the National Assembly.

History 
The party contested the 2021 Ecuadorian general election with the Citizen Revolution Movement in the Union for Hope coalition.

References

See also 

 List of political parties in Ecuador

2012 establishments in Ecuador
Political parties established in 2012
Centrist parties in Ecuador